Hampshire is an unincorporated community in Maury County, Tennessee, United States.

Education
Hampshire Unit School, enrolling kindergarten through grade 12, is operated as a unit of Maury County Public Schools.

Police protection
Since Hampshire is unincorporated, no government body represents the town personally to provide a police service. The Maury County Sheriff's Office maintains all law enforcement duties.  Constables also have concurrent jurisdiction with the sheriff; however, they rarely exercise such authority.

Fire protection
Hampshire is protected by the Hampshire Fire Department, division of the Maury County Fire Department.

Events
Hampshire recently began its annual "Hampshire Jubilee and Festival," which includes vendors, food trucks, and live music.

Notable residents
Wynn Varble

References

Unincorporated communities in Maury County, Tennessee
Unincorporated communities in Tennessee